Princess Sophia Dorothea of Prussia (25 January 1719 – 13 November 1765) was the ninth child and fifth daughter of Frederick William I of Prussia and Sophia Dorothea of Hanover.  By marriage, she was a Margravine of Brandenburg-Schwedt.

Biography

Marriage and children
On 10 November 1734 in Potsdam, Sophia Dorothea married her Hohenzollern kinsman Frederick William, Margrave of Brandenburg-Schwedt, son of Philip William, Margrave of Brandenburg-Schwedt, and Princess Johanna Charlotte of Anhalt-Dessau, daughter of John George II, Prince of Anhalt-Dessau. They had five children:

 Princess Friederike of Brandenburg-Schwedt (18 December 1736 – 9 March 1798); married Frederick II Eugene, Duke of Württemberg.
 Princess Anna Elisabeth Louise of Brandenburg-Schwedt (22 April 1738 – 10 February 1820); married her uncle Prince Augustus Ferdinand of Prussia.
 Prince Georg Philipp of Brandenburg-Schwedt (10 September 1741 – 28 April 1742)
 Princess Philippine of Brandenburg-Schwedt (10 October 1745 – 1 May 1800); married Frederick II, Landgrave of Hesse-Kassel.
 Prince Georg Philipp Wilhelm of Brandenburg-Schwedt (3 May 1749 – 13 August 1751)

Frederick William was 19 years older than the princess and he was called the "mad Margrave" because of his pranks and rude manners. Their relationship was not happy, and eventually they lived in separate places: Sophie lived in the castle Montplaisir near the residence, and the Margrave lived in the castle of Schwedt. They only reconciled during Sophie's terminal illness, when she died in the Margrave's arms. She did not, reportedly, have the same spiritual interests of her sisters. The Margraviate of Schwedt was only a small holding, but enjoyed a prosperous economy due to immigrant Huguenots.

Ancestry

References 

1719 births
1765 deaths
House of Hohenzollern
Prussian princesses
People from Berlin
Margravines of Brandenburg-Schwedt
Burials at Berlin Cathedral
Daughters of kings